Patrick Wirth (born 17 September 1971) is a retired Austrian alpine skier.

He is the brother of the alpine skier Katja Wirth.

Europa Cup results
Wirth has won two disciplines cups in the Europa Cup and  finished two-time second and one third in the overall.

FIS Alpine Ski Europa Cup
Super-G: 1999, 2000

See also
Austrian Alpine Ski Championships
Skiing in Austria

References

External links
 
 

1971 births
Living people
Austrian male alpine skiers
People from Bregenz District
Sportspeople from Vorarlberg